Britt Janyk (born May 21, 1980, in North Vancouver, British Columbia) is a Canadian retired alpine skier, specializing in downhill, super G, alpine combined, and giant slalom, having also competed in slaloms in the past. During her career Janyk scored 18 top 10 finishes in alpine skiing World Cup competition, including two podium finishes, both in downhill races: a win in Aspen and a third in Lake Louise, both in 2007. She announced her retirement from the sport in May 2011.

Her brother Michael Janyk is also an alpine skier who successfully competes in the World Cup.

She contributed regularly to the Eurosport coverage of the 2012-2013 Alpine Skiing World Cup. She was also part of the commentary team for the alpine skiing events for the IOC's international TV feed at the 2018 Winter Olympics in Pyongchang.

World Cup victories

References

External links
Canadian Ski Team bio

 

1980 births
Living people
Canadian female alpine skiers
Alpine skiers at the 2010 Winter Olympics
Olympic alpine skiers of Canada
20th-century Canadian women
21st-century Canadian women